The 2002 season of the Liga de Fútbol Profesional Boliviano was the 45th season of top-tier football in Bolivia.

Torneo Apertura

Torneo Clausura

Aggregate table

Play-offs

Second Place

Promotion/Relegation

Title

Topscorers

Notes

See also
Bolivia national football team 2002

References
RSSSF Page

Bolivian Primera División seasons
Bolivia
1